The "Stellantis Vigo plant" (Centro de Vigo de Stellantis) is a Spanish car manufacturing and assembly plant in the Province of Pontevedra, Galicia, (Spain) owned by Stellantis (the successor of Groupe PSA).

In April 1958, Citroën, responding to the high tariff barriers that protected Spain's domestic auto-makers, established the Vigo car plant in Galicia. As of 2020, the Vigo car plant is one of the largest employers in the region, employing roughly 6,500 workers. It is the company's largest plant outside France and employs mainly outsourced workers.

Beginnings

The plant's origins date back to the April 1958 establishment at Vigo of "Citroën Hispania," employing, during that first year, approximately 100 people.  The choice of Vigo arose from the presence of the port and from the tax advantages arising from the existence of a Francisco Franco created "freeport" zone in Vigo. The first vehicle produced was the Furgoneta AZU, a locally assembled Citroën 2CV van, which would be joined at the plant a year later by the passenger car version of the same vehicle. During the first year 400 were produced.

In August 1959, the company moved to the nearby district of Balaídos, and marked a time of steady expansion, with production rising to 1,700 vehicles, reflecting the increasing pace of demand (due to possible economic growth) in Spain. Production was focused on the domestic market due to poverty as well as the high mutual tariffs characteristic of Spain's economic relations with its neighbours. By 1960, production was up to 3,600 vehicles and over 500 employees. A decade after the creation of "Citroën Hispania", the factory site had virtually reached its current size.

Life became more difficult in the later 1960s and 1970s. The pace of economic growth became less frenetic and other automakers established a presence in Spain including Ford, who arrived with deep pockets and negotiated a deal with the government which from the beginning permitted (and, if their project were to succeed financially, required) capital intensive high volume low cost production methods for their Fiesta model.

Vigo continued to produce only the 2CV and its derivatives, small cars and vans, until 1971 when the mid-size (and by Spanish passenger car standards of the 1960s, "large") Citroën GS was added to the range. Nevertheless, the ongoing focus on inexpensive economy diesel cars and vans reduced the vulnerability of the business to slumps in demand for larger cars that would follow when the economy faltered during the 1970s.

The Oil Price shock of 1973 hit the automobile industry particularly hard, and in the case of Spain was followed in 1975 by the death of Francisco Franco, and a period of threatening socio-economic disruption and unrest as the ensuing régime change unfolded. Citroën's Vigo business nevertheless maintained unspectacular but steady growth, with a record output of more than 110,000 vehicles in 1975, by which time the plant was employing more than 6,000 people.

After Peugeot bought Citroën, the Peugeot 504 began production in Vigo in 1977. Later the Peugeot 505 was built at the plant. However, the bulk of production were Citroën cars such as the Citroën Visa, Citroën BX, Citroën AX, Citroën ZX, Citroën Xsara, Citroën Xsara Picasso and Citroën C4 Picasso.

More than 1.1 million units of the Citroën C15 van were produced from 1984 to 2005. In 1996, the Citroën Berlingo and Peugeot Partner began production.

On 15 July 2008 the plant celebrated its fiftieth anniversary in the presence of Thierry Peugeot and Juan Carlos I of Spain.

The site
The  site includes factory units covering panel stamping, welding, painting and assembly.

Production
In 2005 Vigo produced 422,950 vehicles and 46,410 CKD kits. By 2007, supported by the success of the second generation Citroën Picasso, the plant reported a record output of 547,000, grouped into three production teams.

Centro de Vigo site produced 497,000 vehicles in 2020 and 495,400 in 2021.

Citroën 

 Citroën 2CV (2CV from 1959 to 1984, 280,459 units manufactured), 2CV Sahara (1964, 85 units) and 2CV fourgonnette (AZU from 1958 to 1978, 106,005 units ; AK from 1967 to 1978, 196,037 units)
 Citroën Dynam I
 Citroën Dynam II (from 1967 to 1977, 101,132 units for both generations)
 Citroën Dyane 6 (from 1968 to 1983, 233,104 units)
 Citroën Méhari (from 1969 to 1980, 12,429 units)
 Citroën GS and GSA (from 1971 to 1986, 385,755 units)
 Citroën CX (from 1976 to 1980, 17,199 units)
 Citroën Acadiane (AYU from 1977 to 1987, 249,321 units)
 Citroën Visa (from 1981 to 1987, 231,905 units)
 Citroën BX (from 1983 to 1992, 222,325 units)
 Citroën C15 and C15 First (from 1984 to 2005, 1,181,407 units)
 Citroën AX (from 1986 to 1997, 812,951 units)
 Citroën ZX 5-door (from 1991 to 1997, 291,187 units) et 3-door (from 1992 to 1997, 226,297 units)
 Citroën Berlingo I and Berlingo First (LCV and passenger, 1,521,024 units)
 Citroën Xsara 3-door (from 1997 to 2000, 122,951 units) and 5-door (from 1997 to 1999, 124,754 units)
 Citroën Xsara Picasso (from 1999 to 2010, 1,531,816 units)
 Citroën C4 Picasso I (from 2006 to 2013, 452,446 units) and Grand C4 Picasso I (from 2006 to 2013, 474,483 units)
 Citroën Berlingo II (LCV and Multispace, from 2007 to 2018, 1,141,739 units)
 Citroën C-Elysée (from 2012, 196,679 units as of late 2019)
 Citroën C4 Picasso II, C4 SpaceTourer (from 2013, 293,532 units as of 2019) and Grand C4 Picasso II, Grand C4 SpaceTourer (from 2013, 284,033 units as of 2019)
 Citroën Berlingo III et ë-Berlingo (Van and passenger, from 2018, 149,882 units as of 2019)

Peugeot 

 Peugeot 504 (from 1977 to 1980, 53,323 units)
 Peugeot 505 (from 1980 to 1987, 146,216 units)
 Peugeot Partner I, Partner Origin and Ranch I (LCV and passenger, from 1996 à 2008, 1,048,579 units)
 Peugeot Partner II (LCV et Tepee, from 2007 to 2018, 1,017,159 units)
 Peugeot 301 (from 2012, 232,094 units as of 2019)
 Peugeot Partner III, e-Partner, Rifter and e-Rifter (from 2018, 162,037 units as of 2019)
 Peugeot 2008 II and e-2008 (from 2019, 22,700 units as of 2019)

Opel/Vauxhall 

 Opel/Vauxhall Combo Cargo, Combo-e Cargo, Combo Life and Combo-e Life (from 2018, 17,709 exemplaires as of 2019)

Toyota 

 Toyota ProAce City, ProAce City Electric, ProAce City Verso and ProAce City Verso Electric (from 2019, 505 units as of 2019)

References

External links
Official website

Buildings and structures in Galicia (Spain)
Motor vehicle assembly plants in Spain
1958 establishments in Spain
Vigo